Kuznetsovo is a rural locality (a village) in Terebayevskoye Rural Settlement, Nikolsky District, Vologda Oblast, Russia. The population was 78 as of 2002.

Geography 
Kuznetsovo is located 23 km north of Nikolsk (the district's administrative centre) by road. Guzhovo is the nearest rural locality.

References 

Rural localities in Nikolsky District, Vologda Oblast